Minati Sen (born 2 October 1943) was a member of the 14th Lok Sabha of India. She represented the Jalpaiguri constituency of West Bengal and is a member of the Communist Party of India (Marxist) (CPI(M)) political party.

Positions held
   
1998

Elected to 12th Lok Sabha

1998-1999

Member, Committee on External Affairs and its Sub-Committee-II

Member, Consultative Committee, Ministry of Human Resource Development

1999

Re-elected to 13th Lok Sabha (2nd term)

1999-2004

Member, Committee on External Affairs

2000-2004

Member, Consultative Committee, Ministry of Human Resource Development

2002-2004

Member, Committee on Empowerment of women

2004

Re-elected to 14th Lok Sabha (3rd term)

Member, Committee on Empowerment of Women

Member, Committee on Water Resources

Member, Consultative Committee on Social Justice and Empowerment

16 August 2006 onwards

Member, Committee on Empowerment of Women

Social and Cultural Activities
  
Since college days, she actively participated in various cultural activities, such as theatre, debate and other co-curricular activities; organised blood donation camps, rehabilitation programmes and rendered much support to socially and economically deprived women through "Ganatantrik Mahila Samiti".

External links
 Official biographical sketch in Parliament of India website

Living people
1943 births
Communist Party of India (Marxist) politicians from West Bengal
India MPs 2004–2009
India MPs 1999–2004
India MPs 1998–1999
Lok Sabha members from West Bengal
People from Jalpaiguri
Women in West Bengal politics
20th-century Indian women politicians
20th-century Indian politicians
21st-century Indian women politicians
21st-century Indian politicians
Women members of the Lok Sabha